Angry Birds Blast (stylized as Angry Birds Blast!) is a free-to-play tile-matching puzzle game, developed by Bandai Namco Studios and published by Rovio Entertainment in 2016 as a spin-off from the Angry Birds franchise.

Gameplay 
Similar to other tile-matching games, balloons are cleared from the gameplay field in groups of at least two, adjoining in the same color. The game is divided into levels with specific goals, such as popping specific bird-shaped balloons, pigs, clearing bubbles from the field, or clearing the path for a hot air balloon to reach the top of the field. Similarly to the main franchise, the board may also contain wood and glass panels as obstacles. Power-ups can be earned for clearing larger groups of balloons, such as a column- or row-clearing rocket (5), a bomb (7), or a laser which removes all balloons of a single colour (9 or more).

Boosters, including attacks and additional moves, can be purchased using silver coins earned whilst playing, or with gold coins, which are purchased via microtransactions.

Reception 

Macworld felt that Angry Birds Blast was a "decent game" that "thankfully offers a better attempt at adapting the mobile brand for a color-matching puzzle approach" than other spin-off entries in the Angry Birds franchise, but that the game itself was "uninspiring" due to its similar format to other freemium mobile puzzle games, such as Candy Crush Saga among others. Phone Arena felt that the game was enjoyable and noted that the game was tricky even when in-app purchases were used, but that it was merely a "generic balloon popping game" with Angry Birds theming.

Follow-up games
Blast! later spawned a sequel, Angry Birds Blast Island, that was developed by MYBO Games and soft-launched in select countries in 2018.  While the sequel has yet to receive a global release date, a spin-off, Angry Birds Dream Blast, was released in November that year, featuring younger versions of Red, Chuck and Bomb, as they would appear in the world of The Angry Birds Movie.  Dream features gameplay different from its predecessors by utilizing ball physics.

References 

2016 video games
Android (operating system) games
Tile-matching video games
IOS games
Mobile games
Angry Birds video games